Swarnandhra Pradesh Sports Complex is a sports complex in Gachibowli, Hyderabad, India. It uses a synthetic turf with sophisticated sprinkler system for watering and drainage and has galleries with RC flat slabs and unique suspended steel roof structure. Pavilion housing the Federation Office and amenities including lounges for players, guests and media.

See also

 Gachibowli Athletic Stadium
 Gachibowli Indoor Stadium
 List of stadiums in Hyderabad, India

References

Sports venues in Hyderabad, India
2010 establishments in Andhra Pradesh
Sports venues completed in 2010